The 2010 Swedish speedway season was the 2010 season of motorcycle speedway in Sweden.

Individual

Individual Championship
The 2010 Swedish Individual Championship final was held at the G&B Arena in Målilla, Kalmar County. The title was won by the defending champion Andreas Jonsson, who beat Freddie Lindgren, Magnus Zetterström and Thomas H. Jonasson in the final heat. The top three riders all rode in the 2010 Speedway Grand Prix.

Qualifying round 
 Malmö (11 August 2010)

Final 
 Målilla (18 September 2010)

U21 Championship
The Under-21 Championship was held one day before the senior Final and was won by Dennis Andersson. Andersson beat Linus Eklöf, Linus Sundström and Simon Gustafsson in the final heat. Andersson also won the 2010 Individual Speedway Junior European Championship.

Qualifying round 
 Nyköping (21 August 2010)

Final 
Målilla (17 September 2010)

Team

Team Championship
Vetlanda won the Elitserien.

Hammarby won the Allsvenskan (second tier league).

Play offs

References 

Speedway competitions in Sweden
Speedway leagues
Professional sports leagues in Sweden
Swedish
speedway
Seasons in Swedish speedway